Abdel Fattah Abou-Shanab (born 15 October 1935) is an Egyptian rower. He competed in the 1960 and 1964 Summer Olympics.

References

External links 
 
 

1935 births
Living people
Rowers at the 1960 Summer Olympics
Rowers at the 1964 Summer Olympics
Egyptian male rowers
Olympic rowers of Egypt
20th-century Egyptian people